The High School Attached to Zhejiang University is one of the first group of approved by Zhejiang Education Committee in China. It is located at 89 Shuguang Road, Xihu District, Hangzhou, Zhejiang Province.

History

The High School Attached to Zhejiang University was founded in 1947 as Mingyuan Private School by Mingyuan Club members such as Feng Zikai, Pan Tianshou. In 1959 the school was placed under Zhejiang University. In 1972 it was renamed Hangzhou Fifteenth Middle School and later controlled by the Education Bureau of Hangzhou. It was renamed The High School Attached to Zhejiang University in 1992.

References 

 http://hzzdfz.com/ContentShow.aspx?flag=2&child=11

High schools in Zhejiang
Education in Hangzhou
Buildings and structures in Hangzhou
1947 establishments in China
Educational institutions established in 1947